Trichotoxon martensi is a species of air-breathing land snail or semislugs, a terrestrial pulmonate gastropod mollusk in the family Helicarionidae. This species is endemic to Tanzania.

References

Fauna of Tanzania
Trichotoxon
Taxonomy articles created by Polbot